Valentina Acosta Giraldo (born 19 April 2000) is a Colombian archer. She won the gold medal at the 2019 World Youth Archery Championships. Two years later, she competed in the women's individual event at the 2020 Summer Olympics.

References

External links
 

2000 births
Living people
Colombian female archers
Olympic archers of Colombia
Archers at the 2020 Summer Olympics
Place of birth missing (living people)
Pan American Games medalists in archery
Pan American Games bronze medalists for Colombia
Medalists at the 2019 Pan American Games
Archers at the 2019 Pan American Games
21st-century Colombian women